The women's 4 x 100 metres relay at the 2011 Asian Athletics Championships was held at the Kobe Universiade Memorial Stadium on 10 July.

Results

References
Results

Relay 4x100
Relays at the Asian Athletics Championships
2011 in women's athletics